The Western Society of Naturalists is a scientific organization with a strong focus on promoting the study of marine biology. Most of its members are on the Pacific coast of North America. Originally established in 1910 as the Biological Society of the Pacific, it changed its name in 1916. It held its first meeting under the new name in San Diego on August 10th, 1916, where papers on zoology and botany were presented.

Naturalist of the Year Award
The Naturalist of the Year Award was established in 1999 at the suggestion of Paul Dayton to "recognize those unsung heroes who define our future by inspiring young people with the wonders and sheer joy of natural history".

References

External links
 

Marine biology
Naturalist societies
Organizations established in 1910